D24 is a state road in the northwestern Croatia connecting Zlatar Bistrica on the D29 state road, near the D14 expressway Zlatar Bistrica interchange, Novi Marof on the D3 state road, the A4 motorway Novi Marof interchange and Ludbreg on the D2 state road.

The road, as well as all other state roads in Croatia, is managed and maintained by Hrvatske ceste, state owned company.

Traffic volume 

Traffic is regularly counted and reported by Hrvatske ceste, operator of the road.

Road junctions and populated areas

Maps

Sources

D024
D024
D024